Moycullen is a village in County Galway, Ireland.

Moycullen may also refer to:

 Moycullen (barony) - a barony in County Galway, see List of baronies of Ireland 
 Moycullen (civil parish) - a civil parish in the barony of the same name
 Moycullen (Catholic parish) - an ecclesiastical parish of the Catholic Church roughly coterminous with the above civil parish
 Moycullen GAA - a club of the Gael Athletic Association in the above parish